The White House of the Chickasaws in Milburn, Oklahoma was built in 1895.  It was designed by Dallas architect W.A. Waltham in the Queen Anne style. The house is also known as Gov. Douglas H. Johnston House, because Chickasaw Governor Douglas Hancock Johnston and his descendants resided in the mansion from 1898 to 1971 when the building was listed on the  National Register of Historic Places. At the time of its construction, the house was on the north edge of the community of Emet, Oklahoma, where Johnston operated a store, but its formal street address is now 6379 E. Mansion Dr., Milburn, Oklahoma

On July 21, 1902, Johnston Murray, the son of Oklahoma Governor William H. Murray, was born at the mansion. William H. Murray had married Mary Alice Hearrell, one of Johnston's nieces, and their son, Johnston Murray, would go on to become the 14th Oklahoma Governor. Julie Chisholm, a granddaughter of Jesse Chisholm and a niece of the Johnstons, was also married in the mansion.

The house is now a historic house museum owned by the Chickasaw Nation and has been restored to a 1900 appearance. It was listed on the National Register of Historic Places on August 5, 1971, under Criteria A and C. At that time, the house was still owned by descendants of the Governor.

Construction
The house design was a gingerbread style, commonly used in Victorian architecture during the late 19th century.

The center section of the house had four rooms. From south to north these were:
 Parlor room (aka music room);
 Sitting room (aka library);
 State dining room;
 Kitchen.

Two-room wings flanked the center. The one on the west was separated from the sitting room by an open breezeway. This wing comprised Governor Johnston"s bedroom and office.

General construction lumber was obtained locally, but most of the finishing lumber was transported by wagon from Denison, Texas. The two ornate fireplaces inside the house had mantles and facings made of cherry mahogany, which were brought from Chattanooga, Tennessee. The porch that originally encircled the house used imported walnut for the ornamental woodwork.

The house is well-preserved. Only a few changes have been made to the original design. Around 1903 or 1904, the breezeway was removed and replaced with a stairway that led to the attic area, where a bedroom and bathroom had been added. Indoor bathrooms were added later, and lighting changed from the original coal-oil lamps (both hanging and standing).

Notes

References

External links
 Chickasaw White House - official site

Houses on the National Register of Historic Places in Oklahoma
Houses completed in 1895
Houses in Johnston County, Oklahoma
Museums in Johnston County, Oklahoma
Historic house museums in Oklahoma
Chickasaw
Pre-statehood history of Oklahoma
National Register of Historic Places in Johnston County, Oklahoma
1895 establishments in Oklahoma Territory
Official residences in the United States